The 1927 International Lawn Tennis Challenge was the 22nd edition of what is now known as the Davis Cup. 21 teams entered the Europe Zone, while 4 entered the America Zone. Yugoslavia and Greece competed for the first time, while Germany returned to the competition for the first time since 1914.

France defeated Japan in the Inter-Zonal play-off. The French defeated the United States, capturing their first championship, and ending the USA's 6-year run. The final was played at the Germantown Cricket Club in Philadelphia, Pennsylvania, United States on 8–10 September.

America Zone

Draw

Final
Canada vs. Japan

Europe Zone

Draw

Final
Denmark vs. France

Inter-Zonal Final
France vs. Japan

Challenge Round
United States vs. France

See also
 1927 Wightman Cup

References

External links
Davis Cup official website

Davis Cups by year
 
International Lawn Tennis Challenge
International Lawn Tennis Challenge
International Lawn Tennis Challenge
International Lawn Tennis Challenge